Gigantidas tangaroa is a species of deep-sea mussel, a marine bivalve mollusk in the family Mytilidae, the mussels.

Habitat

Description
Its anterior margin is narrow but evenly rounded. Its posterior margin is convex dorsally, its posterior angulation well-defined, situated above the posterior adductor scar. Its periostracum is thick, hard and a dark brown colour. Its anterior adductor scar is short, and its pallial line curves parallel to its ventral margin.

References

Further reading
Jones, W. J., et al. "Evolution of habitat use by deep-sea mussels." Marine Biology 148.4 (2006): 841-851.
Jones, W. Jo, and Robert C. Vrijenhoek. "Evolutionary relationships within the Bathymodiolus childressi group." Cahiers de biologie marine 47.4 (2006): 403.
von Cosel, Runo, and Ronald Janssen. "Bathymodioline mussels of the Bathymodiolus (sl) childressi clade from methane seeps near Edison Seamount, New Ireland, Papua New Guinea: (Bivalvia: Mytilidae)." Archiv für Molluskenkunde: International Journal of Malacology 137.2 (2008): 195-224.
 Cosel R.von & Marshall B.A. 2003. Two new species of large mussels (Bivalvia: Mytilidae) from active submarine volcanoes and a cold seep off the eastern North Island of New Zealand, with description of a new genus. The Nautilus 117(2): 31-46 
 Cosel R. von & Janssen R. 2008. Bathymodioline mussels of the Bathymodiolus (s. l.) childressi clade from methane seeps near Edison Seamount, New Ireland, Papua New Guinea: (Bivalvia: Mytilidae). Archiv für Molluskenkunde 137(2): 195-224

External links

ADW entry

tangaroa
Molluscs described in 2003